Papéis Avulsos de Zoologia is a peer-reviewed scientific journal covering research in systematics, paleontology, evolutionary biology, ecology, taxonomy, anatomy, behavior, functional morphology, molecular biology, ontogeny, faunistic studies, and biogeography. It is published by the Museum of Zoology of the University of São Paulo and hosted by SciELO.

Abstracting and indexing 
The journal is abstracted and indexed by Biological Abstracts, BIOSIS, DOAJ, Portal de Revistas da USP, SciELO, Scopus, Ulrich's Periodicals Directory and The Zoological Record.

References

External links 

Zoology journals
Publications established in 1941
Creative Commons-licensed journals
Multilingual journals
University of São Paulo
Academic journals published by museums
English-language journals
Portuguese-language journals
Spanish-language journals
Academic journals published by universities of Brazil